Daimonji Kenji (born 21 February 1940 as Kenji Tamura) is a former sumo wrestler from Kyōto, Japan. He made his professional debut in March 1956 and reached the top division in November 1966. His highest rank was maegashira 5. Upon retirement from active competition he became an elder in the Japan Sumo Association, under the name Nishiiwa. He coached at Taihō/Ōtake stable, until reaching the Sumo Association's mandatory retirement age of 65 in February 2005.

Career record
The Kyushu tournament was first held in 1957, and the Nagoya tournament in 1958.

See also
Glossary of sumo terms
List of past sumo wrestlers
List of sumo tournament second division champions

References

1940 births
Living people
Japanese sumo wrestlers
Sumo people from Kyoto Prefecture